Thal may refer to:

Places
 Thal, Lower Austria, Austria
 Thal, Styria, Austria
 Thal, Ruhla, Germany
 Thal, Uttarakhand, Didihat district, India
 Thal, Khyber Pakhtunkhwa, Pakistan
 Thal railway station
 Thal, St. Gallen, Switzerland
 Thal District, Solothurn, Switzerland
 Thal Nature Park, Switzerland
 Thal Desert, Punjab, Pakistan
Thal, kishangarh, Ajmer district, India

People
 Eric Thal (born 1965), American film and stage actor
  (1542–1583), German physician and botanist
 Thal Abergel (born 1982), French chess Grandmaster

Other uses
 Thal (Doctor Who), a fictional alien race

See also

 Ḏāl, an Arabic letter ذ
 Thal Brigade, an Infantry formation of the Indian Army during World War II